JSC Alania Airlines was an airline based in Vladikavkaz, North Ossetia. It operated charter flights from its base at Beslan Airport. In 2007 it was acquired by VIM Airlines.

Fleet 
In August 2007, the Alania Airlines fleet consisted of the following aircraft:

2 Yakovlev Yak-42D

References

External links 

 Alania Airlines official website (defunct) 

Defunct airlines of Russia
Airlines established in 1995
Airlines disestablished in 2007
Companies based in North Ossetia–Alania